Al Shabab Al Arabi Club, or simply Al Shabab, was an Emirati professional football and basketball club based in Dubai, that competed in the UAE Arabian Gulf League. The club was founded in 1958.

In 2017, the club merged with Dubai CSC to join Al Ahli Dubai F.C., which was rebranded as Shabab Al-Ahli Dubai FC.

Honours
UAE Arabian Gulf League
 Winners: 1989–90, 1994–95, 2007–08

UAE President's Cup:
 Winners: 1980–81, 1989–90, 1993–94, 1996-97

UAE League Cup
 Winners: 2010–11

GCC Champions League
 Winners: 1992, 2011, 2015

First Division League:
 Winners: 1974–75

Al Shabab in Asia
 AFC Champions League/Asian Club Championship
1991: Semi-finals
1995: First round
2012: Group Stage
2013: Round of 16
2016: Play off Round

Asian Club Championship history

AFC Champions League history

Record by country

Managerial history

References

External links
 Al Shabab UAE official website 

 
Shabbab, Al
Shabab
Association football clubs established in 1958
1958 establishments in the Trucial States
Association football clubs disestablished in 2017
Defunct football clubs in the United Arab Emirates